Form W-9 (officially, the "Request for Taxpayer Identification Number and Certification") is used in the United States income tax system by a third party who must file an information return with the Internal Revenue Service (IRS). It requests the name, address, and taxpayer identification information of a taxpayer (in the form of a Social Security Number or Employer Identification Number).

The form is never actually sent to the IRS; it is maintained by the individual who files the information return for verification purposes. The information on the Form W-9 and the payment made are reported on a Form 1099.

Use cases

Business–contractor arrangement
Form W-9 is most commonly used in a business–contractor arrangement. Businesses can use Form W-9 to request information from contractors they hire. When a business pays a contractor in excess of $600 during a tax year, the business is required to file Form 1099-MISC, a variant of Form 1099. To fill out Form 1099-MISC, the business may need to request information (such as address and Tax Identification Number) from the contractor, for which Form W-9 is used. The business does not send Form W-9 to the IRS.

Avoiding backup withholding
Another purpose of Form W-9 is to help the payee avoid backup withholding. The payer must collect withholding taxes on certain reportable payments for the IRS. However, if the payee certifies on the W-9 they are not subject to backup withholding they generally receive the full payment due them from the payer. This is similar to the withholding exemptions certifications found on Form W-4 for employees.

Financial institution–customer arrangement
Financial institutions sometimes send Form W-9 to a customer to request information. However, it is not necessarily required for the customer to fill out the form if the institution  already has the requested information from when the customer opened an account.

Employer–employee arrangement
In an employer–employee arrangement, Form W-9 and Form 1099 should not be used. Instead, the corresponding Form W-4 (to provide information) and Form W-2 (to report amount paid) should be filed instead.

However an employer may still send Form W-9 to have the information on record that the payee doesn't need to be sent Form 1099.

Filing method
Form W-9 can be completed on paper or electronically. For electronic filing, there are several requirements. Namely, a requester who establishes an electronic filing system must ensure that the electronic system provides the same information as on a paper Form W-9, that a hard copy can be supplied to the IRS on demand, that "the information received is the information sent and […] all occasions of user access that result in the submission [are documented]", that the person accessing the system and providing the information is the individual identified on the form, and that an electronic signature is used.

Deadline
Some certified public accountants consider it best practice to ensure the completion of Form W-9 by payees before issuing any payments.

There may also be a $50 penalty for each instance in which Form W-9 is not filled out.

See also
Foreign Account Tax Compliance Act

External links
 Fillable PDF version of IRS W-9 Form

References

W-9